Charlie Chan's Murder Cruise is a 1940 murder mystery film starring Sidney Toler in his fifth of many performances as Charlie Chan. It is based on the Earl Derr Biggers 1930 novel Charlie Chan Carries On.

Plot
The famed detective seeks to unmask a killer on a voyage across the Pacific Ocean.

As has been mentioned elsewhere, this story is primarily a remake of the (now) lost movie, Charlie Chan Carries On, (1931) starring Warner Oland. The story has been updated to include more Charlie, but it would be nice to have the missing movie to compare against.

Cast
Sidney Toler as Charlie Chan
Victor Sen Yung as Jimmy Chan (as Sen Yung)
Robert Lowery as Dick Kenyon
Marjorie Weaver as Paula Drake
Lionel Atwill as Dr. Suderman
Don Beddoe as Fredrick Ross
Leo G. Carroll as Prof. Gordon (as Leo Carroll)
Cora Witherspoon as Susie Watson
Leonard Mudie as Gerald Pendleton
Harlan Briggs as Coroner
Charles Middleton as Jeremiah Walters
Claire Du Brey as Sarah Walters
Kay Linaker as Linda Pendleton
James Burke as Wilkie
Richard Keene as Buttons
Layne Tom Jr. as Willie Chan
C. Montague Shaw as Inspector Duff

External links

1940 films
American black-and-white films
Charlie Chan films
Films based on American novels
20th Century Fox films
1940 mystery films
1940s serial killer films
Films directed by Eugene Forde
Films based on mystery novels
American mystery films
1940s American films